Panther Valley is an unincorporated community and census-designated place (CDP) located within Allamuchy Township, in Warren County, New Jersey, United States. As of the 2010 United States Census, the CDP's population was 3,327.

As of the 2000 United States Census, the area of the current CDP was part of the Allamuchy-Panther Valley CDP, which had a 2000 Census population of 3,125. As of the 2010 Census, the CDP was split into Allamuchy CDP (with a 2010 Census population of 78) and Panther Valley.

Geography
According to the United States Census Bureau, the CDP had a total area of 2.978 square miles (7.713 km2), including 2.964 square miles (7.676 km2) of land and 0.014 square miles (0.037 km2) of water (0.48%).

Demographics

Census 2010

References

External links
Panther Valley Property Owners Association

Allamuchy Township, New Jersey
Census-designated places in Warren County, New Jersey